The Australian Screen Sound Guild was formed in 1988 to represent people working in audio engineering and post-production in film, television, multimedia and other related audio industries. such as those involved with location sound, sound editing, audio engineers, sound mixers and engineers, television audio production and multimedia.

The guild is headquartered in Sydney, New South Wales and is directed by a committee which includes representatives from each Australian state, except New South Wales.

Awards
The guild recognises people working in the Australian screen sound industry. Members of the guild nominate work they completed in the previous year, the nominations are judged by the members en masse.

The guild offers awards for best sound, best sound design, best sound mixing and a members' choice award.

References

1988 establishments in Australia
Australian film awards
Awards established in 1988
Film organisations in Australia
Organisations based in Sydney
Guilds in Australia